Christopher Mario Fry is a South African politician who has been a Democratic Alliance (DA) Member of the Western Cape Provincial Parliament since August 2022. He previously served as a DA Member of the National Assembly of South Africa from May to August 2022.

Background
Fry studied Project Management at the University of Cape Town between 2008 and 2009. From November 2018 to November 2021, he was a Democratic Alliance (DA) proportional representation (PR) councillor of the Cape Town City Council. He was a member of the Sub Council 3, the Energy and Climate Change Portfolio Committee, the Leadership and Development Portfolio Committee and the Municipal Public Accounts Committee.

In December 2021, the DA announced that Fry would be joining the National Assembly. He was sworn in on 11 May 2022. Fry later resigned from the National Assembly to become a member of the Western Cape Provincial Parliament. He was sworn in on 3 August 2022.

References

External links
Profile at Parliament of South Africa

Living people
Year of birth missing (living people)
Coloured South African people
Democratic Alliance (South Africa) politicians
Members of the National Assembly of South Africa
Members of the Western Cape Provincial Parliament